Robert Marion (1766March 22, 1811) was a U.S. Representative from South Carolina.

Born 1766 in the Berkeley District of the Province of South Carolina, Marion graduated from the University of the State of Pennsylvania (now the University of Pennsylvania), Philadelphia in 1784.  He owned and managed a plantation at Belle Isle, South Carolina.

He served as a justice of quorum for St. Stephen's Parish and was the Justice of the Peace of Charleston, South Carolina.  He then served in the State house of representatives from 1790 to 1796, and in the State senate from 1802 to 1805.  Marion was elected as a Democratic-Republican to the Ninth, Tenth, and Eleventh Congresses and served from March 4, 1805, until his resignation on December 4, 1810.

He died on his plantation in St. Stephen's Parish, March 22, 1811.

Sources

1766 births
1811 deaths
Year of birth unknown
Democratic-Republican Party members of the United States House of Representatives from South Carolina